Miguel Ángel Pabón (born 16 July 1995) is an Argentine professional footballer who plays as a left winger for Defensores Villa Ramallo.

Career
Pabón's career started with Deportivo Español. He made his professional debut in Primera B Metropolitana on 14 November 2015 against Comunicaciones, coming off the substitutes bench in place of Pablo Villalba Fretes after seventy-seven minutes. That was Pabón's only appearance in 2015, with five further matches arriving in the 2016 season; which included his first start versus Deportivo Armenio. He scored his first goal in April 2017 against Acassuso, with the forward netting seven more goals across the subsequent 2017–18; notably scoring braces home and away against Almirante Brown.

Pabón departed Deportivo Español midway through 2019, subsequently spending the rest of the year with Boca Unidos; making appearances off the bench against Sarmiento and San Martín de Formosa in Torneo Federal A. In November 2020, Pabón joined Atlético Camioneros. He debuted against the aforementioned Sarmiento on 2 November.

Career statistics
.

References

External links

1995 births
Living people
Argentine footballers
Sportspeople from Buenos Aires Province
Association football wingers
Primera B Metropolitana players
Torneo Federal A players
Deportivo Español footballers
Boca Unidos footballers
Defensores de Belgrano de Villa Ramallo players